Loychino is a rural locality (a village) in Almozerskoye Rural Settlement, Vytegorsky District, Vologda Oblast, Russia. The population was 6 as of 2002.

Geography 
Loychino is located 69 km southeast of Vytegra (the district's administrative centre) by road. Rogozino is the nearest rural locality.

References 

Rural localities in Vytegorsky District